Ahmed Ayoub Hafnaoui (born 4 December 2002) is a Tunisian swimmer. He is the African record holder in the short course 800-metre  freestyle and 1500-metre freestyle. He competed in the 2020 Summer Olympics, where he won a gold medal in the men's 400-metre freestyle. He ranked No. 16 in the world and was the slowest qualifier for the final race but won Olympic gold with a time of 3:43.36. Hafnaoui was the only Tunisian to win Olympic gold at Tokyo 2020.

He finished 8th in the final of the 400 m freestyle at the 2018 Summer Youth Olympics in Buenos Aires.

Hafnaoui competed as a 16-year-old at the 2018 World Championships (SC) in the 400 meters, and the 1500 meters, but failed to make the final in either event. As of 2021, he was ranked No. 3 in the 400 meter freestyle.

Background
Hafnoui's father, Mohamed Hafnaoui, was a Tunisian national basketball player. When he was 12 years of age, he began training with the national programme.

Career

2018 
At the African Championships in Algiers, Algeria, Hafnaoui competed in the 800 meter and 1,500 meter freestyle events, as well as the 4x100 and 4x200 freestyle events. He placed third in the 800 meter freestyle (8:08.74), 1,500 meter freestyle (15:45.46), and 4x100 meter men's freestyle (3:27.92), as well as second in the 4x200 freestyle (7:31.55).

At the Youth Olympics in Buenos Aires, Argentina, Hafnaoui competed in the 200 meter, 400 meter, and 800 meter freestyle events; he placed eighth in the 400 meter freestyle with a time of 3:55.94 and seventh in the 800 meter freestyle with a time of 8:04.43.

At the World Championships Short Course in Hangzhou, China, Hafnaoui competed in the 400 meter and 1500 meter freestyle events; he placed 19th in the 400 meter freestyle with a time of 3:45.98 and 17th in the 1500 meter freestyle with a time of 15:02.25.

2019 
Hafnaoui competed in the 400 meter, 800 meter, and 1,500 meter freestyle events at the World Junior Championships in Budapest, Hungary; he placed fourth in the 800 meter freestyle with a time of 7:49.09 and sixth in the 1,500 meter freestyle with a time of 15:16.04.

2021 
Hafnaoui competed in the 400 meter freestyle at the 2020 Summer Olympics in Tokyo, Japan, where he placed first with a time of 3:43.36. He is only the third swimmer in history to win an Olympic gold medal out of the 8th lane, the slowest qualifying lane.  He also placed joint 10th in the 800 meter freestyle, missing qualification for the final.

In October, Hafnauoi announced he would be competing at Etihad Arena in December as part of the 2021 World Short Course Swimming Championships in Abu Dhabi, United Arab Emirates. He entered to compete in the 400 metre freestyle and 1500 metre freestyle events. Starting his competition on day one of the championships, 16 December, Hafnaoui swum a 3:40.30 in the prelims heats of the 400 metre freestyle to rank tenth overall. On Day five, Hafnaoui ranked second in the 1500 metre freestyle prelims heats, qualifying for the final with a time of 14:25.77. He won the silver medal in the final of the 1500 metre freestyle on day six in an African record time of 14:10.94. His time at the 800 metre mark also set a new African record in the 800 metre freestyle at 7:33.69.

2023 
On 11 January 2023, Hafnaoui won the gold medal in the 800-metre freestyle at the TYR Pro Swim Series in Knoxville, United States with a time of 7:53.10, which was over three full seconds faster than second-place finisher American Robert Finke. Two days later, he won the gold medal in the 400-metre freestyle with a time of 3:47.41. On the fourth day, he finished in a personal best time of 15:07.07 in the final of the 1500-metre freestyle, dropping 8.97 seconds from his previous personal best time, to win the silver medal. On 1 March, he lowered his personal best time by 6.83 seconds to a 15:00.24 and won the gold medal in the 1500-metre freestyle at the second stop of the Pro Swim Series, in Fort Lauderdale, United States. The following day he won the 400-metre freestyle in a time of 3:46.02. On day four of four, he finished in 7:48.50 in the 800-metre freestyle and won the gold medal.

Continental records

Short course metres (25 m pool)

Awards and honours
 FINA, Top 10 Moments: 2020 Summer Olympics (#1 for surprising Olympic champion title in 400 metre freestyle)
 Olympics.com, Top 5 Moments: Swimming at the 2020 Summer Olympics (#4 for gold medal in the 400 metre freestyle)
 Swimming World, African Swimmer of the Year (male): 2021
 SwimSwam, Top 100 (Men's): 2022 (#16)

See also
 List of Olympic medalists in swimming (men)
 List of World Swimming Championships (25 m) medalists (men)
 List of African records in swimming

References

External links
 

2002 births
Living people
People from Gafsa Governorate
Swimmers at the 2020 Summer Olympics
Tunisian male swimmers
Olympic swimmers of Tunisia
Olympic gold medalists for Tunisia
Swimmers at the 2018 Summer Youth Olympics
Medalists at the 2020 Summer Olympics
Olympic gold medalists in swimming
Medalists at the FINA World Swimming Championships (25 m)